Llandudno Junction FC are a football club based in Llandudno Junction, playing in the North Wales Coast East Football League Premier Division in Wales.

Club history
The current club was founded as Hotpoint FC in 1975, playing in the Old Colwyn and District Sunday League. During the 1996–97 season the team moved to Llanfairfechan's Recreation Ground due to the limitations of the Victoria Drive ground. As a result, the team changed its name to Llanfairfechan Athletic.

In 1998, the club returned to Llandudno Junction, to their current ground at The Flyover, which had previously been the home of Crosville. The team changed its name again, to Llandudno Junction FC, for the 1999–2000 season.

In the 2008–09 season, the club won the Barrit Cup, and had in their squad future Wolves striker Jake Cassidy.

In 2017, Junction were promoted to the Cymru Alliance, the highest level they had ever played at. However, they lasted only one season in the league before being relegated. The following season (2018–19) they were again relegated, having finished bottom of Division 1 of the Welsh Alliance League.

Honours

Hotpoint Football Club
Vale of Conwy League Section A – Champions: 1986–87 
Vale of Conwy League Section B – Champions: 1984–85
Ron Jones Trophy – Winners: 1984–85
NWWN Challenge Cup – Winners: 1986–87
Cwpan Gwynedd – Winners: 1994–95
Cwpan Gwynedd – Runners-up: 1996–97
Tyn Lon Rover Barritt Cup – Winners: 1998–99
League Runners-up Shield: 1995–96; 1996–97

Llandudno Junction
Welsh Alliance League – Runners-up (3): 2014–15; 2015–16; 2016–17
Tyn Lon Rover Barritt Cup – Winners: 2008–09

Stadium
The club have played at The Flyover ground since 1998. The ground was previously used by Crosville. It features covered seating and standing areas.

Previous clubs

Original club
The original Llandudno Junction first played in the North Wales Coast League Division One in 1910, but folded in 1927.

Honours
Welsh National League (North) – Runners-up: 1924–25

Second club
A second Llandudno Junction entered the Vale of Conwy League at the start of the 1937–38 season. The team were promoted after finishing league runners-up in the 1945–46 season. Their first season in the Welsh League North saw them finish runners-up and in 1948–49 they were league champions. This league was at the time the highest level of league football in North and Central Wales. In 1954, this second incarnation of Llandudno Junction merged with Conwy to form Borough United.

Honours
Welsh League North
Champions: 1948–49
Runners-Up: 1946–47
Vale of Conwy League – Runners-up: 1945-46

Women's team
Llandudno Junction's Ladies side currently compete in the Women's Welsh Premier League. They were founder members of the league in 2009, but suffered relegation in their first season. When the league expanded to 12 teams across a national set-up, Junction regained their place in the top flight.

References

Football clubs in Wales
Welsh Alliance League clubs
Association football clubs established in 1975
1975 establishments in Wales
Cymru Alliance clubs
North Wales Coast Football League clubs
Works association football teams in Wales
Gwynedd League clubs
Welsh National League (North) clubs
Welsh League North clubs